La Tuque is a city located in north-central Quebec, Canada, on the Saint-Maurice River, between Trois-Rivières and Chambord. The population was 11,129 at the 2021 Canadian census, most of which live within the urban area.

The  canoeing race begins at La Tuque.

Etymology
The name, which dates to the eighteenth century, originates from a nearby rock formation which resembles a French-Canadian knitted cap known as the tuque.

In 1823–24, the explorer François Verreault described the location as:

The hat-shaped mountain which gave its name to the town of La Tuque is located between the Saint-Maurice River (left bank) and the WestRock paper mill.

History
The territory of La Tuque was first inhabited by Atikamekw Indigenous people. In the early 1850s, settlers were drawn to the area to exploit the forest resources. The La Tuque Post Office opened in 1887, but the area remained isolated from the rest of the Mauricie until the early 1900s when the National Transcontinental Railway was built, prompting industrial development and the growth of a community on the east bank of the Saint-Maurice River where there was a large set of falls.

On November 15, 1909, the Village Municipality of La Tuque was incorporated, with Achille Comeau as first mayor. A few months later on April 4, 1910, the Village Municipality of La Tuque Falls was formed, with Wenceslas Plante as first mayor. Less than one year later in March 1911, both villages merged to form the Town of La Tuque, with Wenceslas Plante as first mayor.

In the 1940s, the hydro-electric generating station on the Saint-Maurice River was built, resulting in the partial destruction of the rock formation that gave the town its name.

In 1972, the Municipality of Haute-Mauricie was formed out of portions from the unincorporated Carignan and Malhiot Townships, in the proximity of the Saint-Maurice Wildlife Reserve. However, its low population and constantly rising administrative costs led to the merger of Haute-Mauricie with La Tuque in August 1993.

On March 26, 2003, Le Haut-Saint-Maurice Regional County Municipality was dissolved and all its municipalities and unorganized territories were amalgamated into the new City of La Tuque, thereby becoming the largest municipality with city status in land area in Quebec, and largest in Canada (38,000 km2). On January 1, 2006, the municipalities of La Bostonnais and Lac-Édouard separated and were reestablished.

In May 2010, some 120 forest fires broke out around La Tuque, burning until June. Smoke from these fires reached portions of Eastern Ontario and southern Quebec, including the cities of Ottawa and Montreal, as well as the northern US states.

In 2011, the 100th anniversary of La Tuque was celebrated with various cultural activities, including a large parade held on June 25 as well as the creation of a recipe book made by local residents.

Geography
While the urban area of La Tuque is relatively small, its entire territory is the largest city in Canada. It consists of almost all the entire former regional county municipality of Le Haut-Saint-Maurice, and includes the settlements of Carignan, Clova, La Croche, Fitzpatrick, Kiskissink, Oskélanéo, Parent, Rapide-Blanc, Rivière-aux-Rats, and Sanmaur.

Enclosed by but not administratively part of the city are the three First Nations reserves of Coucoucache, Obedjiwan, and Wemotaci.

Notable bodies of water in La Tuque are:
 Gouin Reservoir
 Lake Edouard
 Lake Kiskissink
 Lake Wayagamac
 Grand Lake Bostonnais
 Ventadour Lake 

Notable rivers in La Tuque are:
 Saint-Maurice
 Vermillon
 Manouane
 Croche
 Bostonnais
 Little Bostonnais
 Trenche

Climate
La Tuque has a humid continental climate (Köppen Dfb) with warm summers and cold, snowy winters.

Demographics 

Territorial equivalent 

The population of the La Tuque territorial equivalent according to the Canada 2021 Census is 15,038.

Economy

The local economy centres on pulp and paper; the city has a pulp-milling centre as well as a major hydroelectric station.

As the gateway to the upper Mauricie, La Tuque's economy also offers outdoor tourism opportunities and caters to hunting and fishing trips in its large hinterland, which is partially regulated by the following :
 Zec de la Croche
 Zec de la Bessonne
 Zec Borgia
 Zec Frémont
 Zec du Gros-Brochet
 Zec Jeannotte, Québec
 Zec Kiskissink
 Zec Menokeosawin
 Zec Tawachiche
 Zec Wessonneau

Transportation
The main highway is Quebec Route 155 that connects La Tuque with Shawinigan to the south and the Saguenay–Lac-Saint-Jean region to the north.

The Canadian National Railway dissects La Tuque's territory. This railway, built in 1910 by the National Transcontinental Railway, connected Quebec City to the Canadian Prairies and goes through vast wilderness areas of northern Quebec and Ontario. While it was intended to ship grain from the prairies to the Port of Quebec and to open up virgin territories, it never carried much rail traffic. However, it is still serviced by Via Rail at the La Tuque railway station and Parent railway station, with request stops at Fitzpatrick, Oskélanéo, and Clova. Other sidings along the line are Casey, Hibbard, Cann, Sanmaur, Vandry, Windigo, and Rapide-Blanc-Station.

The La Tuque Airport is located directly south of the town's centre on Route 155. La Tuque Water Aerodrome is located just north of the city centre.

Government

Urban agglomeration

The Urban agglomeration of La Tuque is an urban agglomeration that consists of:
the city of La Tuque,
the municipality of La Bostonnais,
the municipality of Lac-Édouard.

The agglomeration comprises the elements of the redefined city of La Tuque as it existed after amalgamation on March 26, 2003, including the two municipalities that chose to de-merge on January 1, 2006.

The agglomeration of La Tuque succeeded to the regional county municipality of Haut-Saint-Maurice, which was created in 1982 from part of the Quebec ridings's (county's) of Champlain electoral district, of Quebec electoral district of Saint-Maurice and of Abitibi.  Le Haut-Saint-Maurice was dissolved during the merger of all municipalities in 2003 to create the city of La Tuque. Following the referendum on recreating La Bostonnais and Lac-Édouard, the agglomeration of La Tuque was created to allow municipalities to manage in common some competencies.

Census division
La Tuque is a territory equivalent to a regional county municipality (TE) and census division of Quebec, with geographical code 90. The TE of La Tuque consists of:
the municipalities of the urban agglomeration of La Tuque, namely
the city of La Tuque
the municipality of La Bostonnais
the municipality of Lac-Édouard
three Indian reserves, namely
Coucoucache
Wemotaci
Obedjiwan

List of mayors
The mayor is the municipality's highest elected official. La Tuque has had fifteen mayors, since its incorporation as a city.

Notable residents
  (1939–2009), animator, humourist and actor
 , actor
 Mathieu Fortin, writer
Maude Guérin, actress
 , environmentalist
Félix Leclerc (1914–1988), singer-songwriter, poet, writer, actor and Québécois political activist
Sylvie Roy, politician
 , TV reporter
James Renald, musician
Gaétan Barrette, politician

See also

 La Tuque Water Aerodrome
 Municipal history of Quebec
 Municipal reorganization in Quebec

References

External links

  City of La Tuque official website
  La Tuque (Tourisme Haut-Saint-Maurice)
    service de publicitées...
  Ville de La Tuque (Haut-Saint-Maurice)
  Eau Quai Saint-Maurice (Kayaking on St. Maurice River)
  Tourisme Mauricie, regional tourist office
  Association des stations de ski du Québec, ski area profile

 
Cities and towns in Quebec